The 2002–03 Ice Hockey Superleague season was the seventh and final season of the Ice Hockey Superleague (ISL).

The Ayr Scottish Eagles, under new management, moved from the Centrum Arena in Ayr to the Braehead Arena just outside Glasgow and shortened their name to simply the Scottish Eagles.

The Ahearne Trophy was played for again this season with the competition taking with teams from the Norwegian Eliteserien.

Starting the season with seven teams, the league invited members of the British National League (BNL) to take part in the Challenge Cup. The call was taken up by the Coventry Blaze, meaning eight teams took part in the competition. However, after playing their Challenge Cup games, the Manchester Storm went into liquidation and their record for the Challenge Cup and league games was expunged. Not long after, the Scottish Eagles confirmed they had withdrawn from the league with the intention of re-launching the following season. The Eagles' record was also expunged and their place in the Challenge Cup semi-finals was taken by third place team Belfast Giants. On 30 November 2002, the Bracknell Bees announced that they would be moving from the ISL to the BNL for the following season. When the London Arena was sold for development the London Knights had played their final game.

Leaving the ISL with only three teams, the league folded at the end of the season and the three surviving clubs – Belfast Giants, Nottingham Panthers and Sheffield Steelers – helped form the Elite Ice Hockey League for the following season (see 2003–04 EIHL season).

Challenge Cup
With eight teams taking part in the Challenge Cup and with a British National League team taking part, the competition was separate to the league and the teams were split into two groups of four teams: Belfast Giants, Manchester Storm, Scottish Eagles and Sheffield Steelers were in Group A and Bracknell Bees, Coventry Blaze, London Knights and Nottingham Panthers were in Group B. The top two teams of each group progressed to the semi finals. The semi finals and finals were all one off games.

Group A

1 Belfast Giants go through taking Scottish Eagles place due to retiring from the league and competition.

Group B

Semi-finals
1st place Group A (Sheffield ) vs 2nd place Group B (London)
Sheffield Steelers 5–4 London Knights (after overtime and penalty shootout)

1st place Group B (Nottingham) vs 2nd place Group A (Belfast)
Nottingham Panthers 3–2 Belfast Giants

FinalWinner semi final 1 vs Winner semi final 2Sheffield Steelers 3–2 Nottingham Panthers

Ahearne Trophy
The Ahearne Trophy was won by the Superleague on 8 February 2003, after Belfast Giants and Sheffield Steelers won over Frisk Tigers and Storhamar Dragons respectively.

League
Each team played four home games and four away games against each of their opponents. All five teams in the league were entered into the playoffs.

Playoffs
All five teams in the league took part in the playoffs. After an initial round where each team played all the other teams twice at home and twice away, the top four teams qualified for the finals weekend.

Round one

Semi-finals1st place vs 4th placeBelfast Giants 1-0 Sheffield Steelers (after overtime and penalty shootout)2nd place vs 3rd placeLondon Knights 4–3 Nottingham Panthers

FinalWinner semi final 1 vs Winner semi final 2Belfast Giants 5–3 London Knights

Awards
Coach of the Year Trophy – Mike Blaisdell, Sheffield Steelers
Player of the Year Trophy – Joel Laing, Sheffield Steelers

All Star teams

Scoring leaders
The scoring leaders are taken from all league games.

Most points: 36 Lee Jinman (Nottingham Panthers)
Most goals: 16 Den Ceman (Bracknell Bees)
Most assists: 24 Lee Jinman (Nottingham Panthers) and Robby Sandrock (Belfast Giants)
Most PIMs: 150''' Barry Nieckar (Nottingham Panthers)

References
Ice Hockey Journalists UK
The Internet Hockey Database
Malcolm Preen's Ice Hockey Results and Tables

Footnotes

Ice Hockey Superleague seasons
1
United